The 1962 Connecticut Huskies football team represented the University of Connecticut in the 1962 NCAA College Division football season.  The Huskies were led by 11th-year head coach Bob Ingalls, and completed the season with a record of 3–6.

Schedule

References

Connecticut
UConn Huskies football seasons
Connecticut Huskies football